Jesionowo  is a village in the administrative district of Gmina Przelewice, within Pyrzyce County, West Pomeranian Voivodeship, in north-western Poland.

For the history of the region, see History of Pomerania.

References

Jesionowo